Princes Park is a 38.6 hectare (95.4 acre) park in the inner-Melbourne suburb of Carlton North, Victoria. It is located directly north of the University of Melbourne and bounded on its eastern and western sides by Melbourne General Cemetery and Royal Parade respectively  Although the park consists of a number of Australian rules football ovals, the bowling green of the Prince’s Park Carlton Bowls Club Bowls, and a small stretch of parkland, it is best known as the location of Ikon Park, the old Prince’s Park Football Ground, the home of the Carlton Football Club. The park also contains a children's playground; the Within Three Worlds sculpture; a barbecue and picnic facilities.

The park's site was originally proclaimed as "Prince's Park" on 9 June 1873 under The Land Act 1869 by the Minister for Lands and Agriculture, J. J. Casey, and its size was expressed at 97 acres. It was named for Albert, Prince Consort. It was established at the same time as other existing and iconic parks.

The Capital City Trail passes through the northern section of the park, following the path of the now-closed Inner Circle railway line.

In January 2006 and 2007 Big Day Out (a popular Australasian music festival) was held at Princes Park on the ovals at the park's southern end. The event's traditional venue, the Royal Melbourne Showgrounds was unavailable due to redevelopment.

The running track around the perimeter of Princes Park is 3.183 kilometres. The track is made of compacted gravel and drains well in wet weather. Aside from general recreational use, the track is used also for running and walking events. Regular events include the Sri Chimnoy Prince’s Park Winter Running Festival, Victorian Road Runners Prince’s Park Fun Run, and the Parkville parkrun.

In 2018, Australian comedian and actress Eurydice Dixon was murdered by James Todd in the park. Todd is currently serving a life sentence as.

References

External links

 Satellite photo of Princes Park
 Princes Park master plan (n.d.)

Parks in Melbourne
Buildings and structures in the City of Melbourne (LGA)
Sport in the City of Melbourne (LGA)